Lists of Ancient Roman governors are organized by the provinces of the Roman Republic and the subsequent Roman Empire, which lasted from 27 BC to 476 AD, but whose eastern part continued to 1453 AD.

 List of Roman governors of Achaea
 List of Roman governors of Africa
 List of Roman governors of Arabia Petraea
 List of Roman governors of Asia
 List of Roman governors of Bithynia and Pontus
 List of governors of Roman Britain
 List of Roman governors of Cappadocia
 List of Roman governors of Cilicia
 List of Roman governors of Creta et Cyrenaica
 List of Roman governors of Roman Cyprus
 List of Roman governors of Dacia Traiana
 List of Roman governors of Dalmatia
 List of governors of Roman Egypt
 List of Roman governors of Gallia Belgica
 List of Roman governors of Gallia Narbonensis
 Roman Republican governors of Gaul
 List of Roman governors of Germania Inferior
 List of Roman governors of Germania Superior
 List of Roman governors of Macedonia
 List of Roman governors of Mauretania Tingitana
 List of Roman governors of Moesia
 List of Roman governors of Lower Moesia
 List of Roman governors of Upper Moesia
 List of Roman governors of Noricum
 List of Roman governors of Pannonia Inferior
 List of Roman governors of Pannonia Superior
 List of Roman governors of Raetia
 List of Roman governors of Sicilia
 List of Roman governors of Syria